Effi Briest is a 1971 East German film directed by Wolfgang Luderer.

Plot summary

Differences from novel

Cast 
Angelica Domröse as Effi Briest
Horst Schulze as Geert von Imstetten
Walter Lendrich as Alonzo Gießhübler
Ursula Am-Ende as Sidonie von Grasenabb
Angelika Ritter as Hertha Jahnke
Susanne Tischbier as Bertha Jahnke
Marianne Wünscher as Marietta Tripelli
Gerda Quies as Hulda Niemeyer
Gerhard Bienert as Herr von Briest
Inge Keller as Frau von Briest
Dietrich Körner as Major von Crampas
Waltraud Kramm as Frau von Crampas
Harry Studt as Herr von Grasenabb
Traute Sense as Frau von Grasenabb
Heinz Hinze as Herr von Ahlemann
Hanna Rieger as Frau von Ahlemann
Axel Triebel as Baron von Jatzkow
Erich Brauer as Baron von Borcke
Hans Zimmermann as Kutscher Kruse
Adolf Peter Hoffmann as Geheimrat Wüllersdorf
Horst Friedrich as Dr. Rumschüttel
Werner Schulz-Wittan as Dr. Hannemann
Hans-Hartmut Krüger as Gizicki
Hans Flössel as Wilke
Hilde Kneip as Christel
Eckhard Bilz as Dagobert
Günther Ballier as Friedrich
Krista Siegrid Lau as Johanna
Lissy Tempelhof as Roswitha
Lisa Macheiner as Ministerin
Hannes W. Braun as Erster befrakter Herr
Karl-Helge Hofstadt as Zweiter befrakter Herr
Blanche Kommerell

External links 

1971 films
1971 television films
East German films
Television in East Germany
German television films
1970s German-language films
German-language television shows
Television shows based on German novels
Films based on German novels
Films based on works by Theodor Fontane
Adultery in films
Films set in Prussia
Films set in the 1880s